The 2021 season was the 26th in the history of the Major League Soccer club New England Revolution. The season began on April 17, 2021 and in addition to the league, the Revolution were also to compete in the 2021 U.S. Open Cup, before the competition was canceled in July.

The 2021 season saw the Revolution win their first Supporters' Shield in club history by having the best record in the regular season. They were eliminated in the conference semifinals of the MLS Cup playoffs after losing to New York City FC in a shootout.

Roster changes

Signings in

Out

Current squad

Results

Preseason

MLS Regular Season

MLS Cup Playoffs

References

External links
 New England Revolution website

New England Revolution
New England Revolution
New England Revolution seasons
New England Revolution
Sports competitions in Foxborough, Massachusetts
Supporters' Shield winning seasons